Risinghurst and Sandhills is a civil parish in the city of Oxford, Oxfordshire, England.  It consists of Risinghurst and Sandhills, two areas in the east of Oxford, east of the junction of the A40 and the A4142.  It is elongated, excludes green space to the north, south and east and is approximately l-shaped, traversing two dual carriageways at right angles; these are crossed by a bridge and a subway and the density of the area is relatively homogenous.  As at the 2011 census, it had a population of 4,237.  Its contiguous neighbours are New Headington (the denser Headington Quarry neighbourhood) and Barton to the west.

External links
 Risinghurst and Sandhills Parish Council website

Local government in Oxford
Geography of Oxford
Civil parishes in Oxfordshire